Qalam Collegiate Academy is a private faith-based middle and high school (grades 5-12) in Richardson, Texas. Named after the chapter Qalam in the Quran. Qalam is enjoyed by the majority of the students at the School. The school is now under a different administration as of Fall 2018, with new principals and teachers. This results in a better student response.

The School has won many awards at MIST

External links
 Official website

Schools in Texas